Francis Ewan Urquhart is a fictional character and the villainous main protagonist of Michael Dobbs's House of Cards trilogy of novels and television series, portrayed by Ian Richardson. A member of the Conservative Party, Urquhart is depicted as a ruthless politician who rises from Chief Whip of the Conservative Party to Prime Minister of the United Kingdom through treachery, deception and murder. He is married to Elizabeth Urquhart (Diane Fletcher), who appears to have a great deal of power over her husband, and often identifies his powers and abilities, or persuades him to use a given situation to his advantage. The protagonist had a sexual relationship with Mattie Storin (Susannah Harker) in the first serial and one with Sarah Harding (Kitty Aldridge) in the second serial.

Urquhart was born in an aristocratic family with roots in the Scottish aristocracy, and served in the British Army in Cyprus for three years. After resigning his commission, Urquhart went on to study at the University of Oxford. Turning to politics, Urquhart joined the Conservative Party and became the MP for the constituency of New Forest in 1974. He served in several ministerial positions before becoming Chief Whip in 1987. Some of Urquhart's dialogue throughout the series is presented in a direct address to the audience, a narrative technique that breaks the fourth wall. These narrative asides are notably an invention of the television adaptation, as the book used third-person narration throughout.

Urquhart has been described as conniving, Machiavellian, sociopathic, and a symbol of political corruption.  Throughout the series, he manipulates and destroys several people, including those he calls friends, for his own ends. He is depicted as being willing to go to any lengths, even murder, to see that his intricate schemes paid off. During the first serial, he is the Chief Whip, before achieving his ambitious goal, becoming Prime Minister of the United Kingdom in the season finale. The follow-up serials To Play the King (1993) and The Final Cut (1995) focus on Urquhart's premiership, as he refuses to relinquish his position until he has beaten Margaret Thatcher's record as longest serving post-war prime minister. Urquhart is characterised by his usage of the catchphrase, "You might very well think that; I couldn't possibly comment", or a variation thereon, as a plausibly deniable way of agreeing with people and/or leaking information.

Richardson received positive reviews for his portrayal of Urquhart, and won a BAFTA award for his performance. Urquhart's character inspired Frank Underwood, the villainous main protagonist of the American adaptation of House of Cards, portrayed by Kevin Spacey. Howard Rosenberg of the Los Angeles Times praised Urquhart as making "Richard Nixon look like a guileless wimp." Urquhart's catchphrase – "You might very well think that; I couldn't possibly comment" – has entered the national lexicon, and has been quoted in the House of Commons.

Development and reception
Michael Dobbs stated that the inspiration behind Urquhart came during a drinking session at a swimming pool after a tense encounter with Margaret Thatcher, deliberately creating a character moulded around the initials "FU". Ian Richardson was offered the role of Urquhart for the BBC TV adaptation of House of Cards in 1990, which he immediately accepted, noting:

Richardson based his portrayal of the character on a representative of the British Council whom he met whilst touring with the Royal Shakespeare Company in Japan. While acknowledging that playing Urquhart brought him immediate public recognition, Richardson stated that as a Scottish Presbyterian, he found the character's "Machiavellian deviousness" and sex appeal "really rather revolting". Nevertheless, despite finding him "an irritating bugger", Richardson found Urquhart "a joy to play".

The character also took inspiration from contemporary Conservative politicians, including the fearsome Conservative Party whip Tristan Garel-Jones.

Howard Rosenberg of the Los Angeles Times praised Urquhart as making "Richard Nixon look like a guileless wimp." Urquhart's catchphrase – "You might very well think that; I couldn't possibly comment" – has entered the national lexicon, and has been quoted in the House of Commons.

Depiction

Personality and background
Urquhart is portrayed as having few other interests outside politics, though he is an avid reader of Italian Renaissance poetry and Elizabethan/Jacobean drama, with John Webster and Cyril Tourneur being among his favorite authors. He frequently quotes William Shakespeare, particularly Macbeth.

The novels provide him with a backstory: Urquhart was born in 1936, the youngest of the Earl of Bruichcladdich's three sons. His older brother, Alaister, was killed in the Second World War, while the middle brother, William, worked for the family estate and occasionally sat in the House of Lords. The first novel reveals that his father committed suicide, and that his mother disowned him after he decided to go into politics rather than maintain the family estate.

Urquhart was educated at Fettes (although he often wears an Old Etonian tie in the BBC adaptation) where, although not noted for brilliance, he was recognized for his diligence and industriousness. He joined the British Army at age 18, and spent three years in Cyprus, where he was commended for bravery in his capture and interrogation of EOKA terrorists. Urquhart resigned his commission after a colleague was court-martialed for accidentally killing a suspect, and took up a deferred place at the University of Oxford reading History, where he narrowly missed getting a First. He later taught Renaissance Italian History at the university, becoming an authority on the Medici and Machiavelli. He married Elizabeth McCullough, eldest daughter of whisky magnate William McCullough, in 1960. By the time of House of Cards, Urquhart has long abandoned academia in favour of politics, having steadily risen to the position of Chief Whip.

Politics
Urqhuart lives in Lyndhurst, Hampshire and represents the county constituency of New Forest for the Conservative Party. He is right-wing and his policies include abolishing the Arts Council, outlawing vagrancy, reintroducing conscription and banning pensioners from National Health Service treatment unless they have paid for Age Insurance. He describes himself to his wife, Elizabeth, as "a plain, no-nonsense, old-fashioned Tory." In To Play the King, the King of Britain accuses Urquhart of practically abandoning Scotland and Wales. Urquhart notes that he detests the welfare state and contemporary youth culture.

Urquhart's foreign policy is Anglocentric; he thinks that Britain has more to teach the world, and Europe in particular, than the other way around. He would like to see the rest of the European Union speaking English – a position that would then completely alienate Foreign Secretary Tom Makepeace. Besides this, his strong belief in discipline and the rule of law shapes his foreign policy in Cyprus, where he authorises the use of force against schoolgirls who are blocking military vehicles.

Fictional character biography

House of Cards
Following the resignation of Prime Minister Margaret Thatcher, the moderate but indecisive Henry Collingridge emerges as both Thatcher's successor and the leader of the Conservative Party; the party wins the next general election with a reduced majority. Shortly afterwards, Urquhart, the party's Chief Whip, submits a memorandum to Collingridge advocating a cabinet reshuffle that would contemplate a prominent ministerial position for Urquhart himself. However, Collingridge discards Urquhart's proposals on the basis that doing so would probably adversely affect the party's popularity. Enraged, Urquhart begins plotting an intricate, long-term political revenge.

Urquhart exploits his position as Chief Whip to leak inside information to the press to undermine Collingridge, ultimately forcing him to resign. Most of his leaks are to Mattie Storin, a young reporter for a tabloid newspaper called The Chronicle.  With his wife's encouragement, Urquhart had gained her ultimate trust by having a sexual relationship with her. Their relationship is paternal as well as sexual; she is attracted to him in part because he is old enough to be her father, and often calls him "daddy".

Urquhart systematically eliminates his enemies in the resulting leadership contest by means of fabricated scandals that he sets up himself or publicizes. These include threatening to publish photographs of Education Secretary Harold Earle in the company of a rent boy; causing Health Secretary Peter MacKenzie to accidentally run over a disabled man; and forcing Foreign Secretary Patrick Woolton to withdraw by blackmailing him with an audiotape of a one-night stand that Urquhart himself orchestrated. His remaining rival, Environment Secretary Michael Samuels, is alleged by the press to have supported far-left politics as a university student. Urquhart thereby reaches the brink of victory.

Prior to the final ballot, Urquhart ties up loose ends by murdering the party's drug-addicted and increasingly unstable public relations consultant, Roger O'Neill, whom he forced into helping him to remove Collingridge from office. Urquhart invites O'Neill to his country house near Southampton, gets him drunk, and puts rat poison in his cocaine.

The ending of the novel and TV series differ significantly (indeed, only the ending and popularity of the TV series prompted author Michael Dobbs to write the sequels). Mattie untangles Urquhart's web and confronts him in the deserted roof garden of the Houses of Parliament. In the novel, he commits suicide by jumping to his death. In the TV drama, he throws Mattie off the roof to her death, and claims she committed suicide. Shortly afterward, Urquhart is driven to Buckingham Palace to be invited by the Queen to form a government as Prime Minister. He does not know that Mattie was taping their conversations, and that someone has found the tape.

To Play the King
The second installment starts with Urquhart, in his second term as Prime Minister, feeling a sense of anti-climax. Having gained great power and influence, he wonders how to use them. His wife comments that he needs a challenge. This challenge is shortly provided in the form of the new King, a political idealist who opposes Urquhart's hard-line policies. He does not directly criticise Urquhart in public, but makes speeches about the direction he wishes the country to pursue, which contrasts with the Government's policies. Urquhart wins the confidence of the King's estranged wife and uses his influence in the press to reveal intimate and scandalous secrets concerning the royal family. The King is dragged into campaigning on behalf of the Opposition during a general election which Urquhart wins, creating a constitutional crisis and finally forcing the King to abdicate in favour of his teenage son, whom Urquhart expects to be a much less influential monarch.

Meanwhile, Urquhart's right-hand man and Party Chairman, Tim Stamper, becomes embittered by Urquhart's failure to reward his loyalty and plans to bring him down. He acquires the tape of Mattie's murder and plans to go to the police with it. Urquhart learns of Stamper's mutiny, however, and has him killed. He also eliminates his own aide (and lover) Sarah Harding, in whom Stamper had confided. Both perish in car explosions, made to appear as IRA terrorist attacks by Urquhart's bodyguard, Commander Corder.

With a tame monarch and no threat in sight, Urquhart is secure as Prime Minister.

The Final Cut
The last installment in the trilogy portrays the embattled and increasingly unpopular Urquhart determined to "beat that bloody woman's record" of longevity as Prime Minister, as well as make his mark on the office. He sets about reuniting Cyprus, both to secure his legacy, and to gain substantial revenue for "The Urquhart Trust" after a Turkish Cypriot businessman informs Urquhart of an international sea boundary deal which would give the exploitation rights for offshore oil to the British and the Turks. His past is catching up with him, however – a tenacious Cypriot girl and her father are determined to prove that he murdered her uncles while serving as an officer during the unrest that preceded independence in 1956. He also fires his more liberal and pro-European Foreign Secretary, Tom Makepeace, leaving Makepeace free to challenge Urquhart for the party leadership.

When civil unrest erupts in Cyprus, Urquhart orders a military raid that results in the deaths of several civilians, including children. Urquhart's party turns on him, and it appears inevitable that he will be forced out of office. Worse, he faces the prospect of imprisonment when evidence of the murders he committed in Cyprus – as well as the recording of Mattie's murder – falls into Makepeace's hands. Urquhart is shot dead at the unveiling of the Margaret Thatcher memorial, having been Prime Minister for 4,228 days – one day longer than Thatcher. In the TV series Urquhart's bodyguard, Corder, arranges his assassination with the consent of his wife (who is implied to be Corder's lover) to stop the dark secrets from Urquhart's past being revealed. In the novel, Urquhart allows himself to be killed by an assassin who is out for revenge, martyring himself in the process by pushing his wife out of the way and saving her life. He receives a state funeral, and soon afterward his party wins a landslide re-election.

Other incarnations

In the U.S. remake of the House of Cards trilogy, Urquhart's place is filled by Francis "Frank" Underwood (Kevin Spacey), a Democratic representative from South Carolina's 5th district and House Majority Whip, who schemes and murders his way to becoming President of the United States. According to series producer Beau Willimon, the change in last name stemmed from the "Dickensian" feeling and "more legitimately American" sounding resonance of the name 'Underwood'. Whereas Urquhart is an aristocrat by birth, Underwood is a self-made man, having been born into a poor Southern family with an alcoholic father. Urquhart was one of television's first antiheroes, whereas Underwood follows the more recent rash of antiheroes that includes Tony Soprano of The Sopranos, Walter White of Breaking Bad, and Dexter Morgan of Dexter. However, unlike most other antiheroes, Underwood is not forced into immorality either by circumstance (White), birth (Soprano) or upbringing (Morgan). In his review of Season 2, Slant Magazine's Alan Jones writes that Underwood is evil by choice. Although the character is based on the BBC show's lead character, in interviews during the writing and filming of season 2, creator and showrunner Willimon said that he used Lyndon B. Johnson as a source of themes and issues addressed in House of Cards. Unlike the right wing Urquhart, who leads the Conservative Party, Underwood is a member of the Democratic Party, but cares little for ideology in favor of "ruthless pragmatism" in furthering his own political influence and power.

References

House of Cards (British TV series)
Fictional characters who break the fourth wall
Fictional prime ministers of the United Kingdom
Fictional murderers
Fictional Scottish people
Literary characters introduced in 1990
Characters in British novels of the 20th century
Fictional murdered people
Drama television characters
Male characters in literature
Male characters in television